Symbra was a town in the west of ancient Lycia, located near to Comba.

Its site is unlocated.

References

Populated places in ancient Lycia
Former populated places in Turkey
Lost ancient cities and towns